Vehkalahti is a former municipality surrounding the town of Hamina in south-eastern Finland. At the beginning of 2003 Hamina and Vehkalahti combined to form a new town of Hamina.

History
These southern parts of Karelia are known to be the oldest parts of modern Finland with settlements. First markings of Vehkalahti as a continuous settlement or village are dated in 1336, when it has become a major place for east/west trading. The plans to build a town grew slowly as the place become crowded. In 1653 the area surrounding the village church officially became a town, which was called Vehkalahden Uusikaupunki.

Surroundings
While the area in the immediate vicinity of the church building became a town, the surrounding land remained countryside. Formerly the area of Vehkalahti was much larger, almost the entire Kymenlaakso, but later many areas became new municipalities. Largest population centers are Husula, Salmenkylä, Uusi-Summa, Poitsila and Neuvottoma, there are also many rural villages like Metsäkylä, Reitkalli, Kannusjärvi and Pyhältö.

Peculiar Nobility
In literature, Vehkalahti is particularly renowned for its peculiar medieval petty nobility, knaappiaateli (families Husgafvel, Pilhjerta and Brandstaka), which also acted as a link between Vehkalahti and the Vyborg Castle. Today it is located on Russian territory.

Vehkalahti church
The Vehkalahti church (now known as St. Mary's church, or Marian kirkko in Finnish) was built in the 14th century at the place where the town of Hamina is now.

References

Bibliography
 
 

Hamina
Former municipalities of Finland
Populated places established in the 1330s
Populated places disestablished in 2003